Matt Sherman (born June 17, 1974) is a former American football quarterback in the Arena Football League who played for the Iowa Barnstormers. He played college football for the Iowa Hawkeyes.

References

1974 births
Living people
American football quarterbacks
Iowa Barnstormers players
Iowa Hawkeyes football players
People from Mitchell County, Iowa
Players of American football from Iowa